Daniel Málek (born 25 May 1973 in Zlín) is a retired male breaststroke swimmer from the Czech Republic, who won two bronze medals in the men's breaststroke events at the 1997 European Championships in Seville, Spain. He represented his native country at three consecutive Summer Olympics, starting in Atlanta, Georgia (1996).

References
 

1973 births
Living people
Czech male swimmers
Male breaststroke swimmers
Olympic swimmers of the Czech Republic
Swimmers at the 1996 Summer Olympics
Swimmers at the 2000 Summer Olympics
Swimmers at the 2004 Summer Olympics
Sportspeople from Zlín
European Aquatics Championships medalists in swimming